The 1990–91 FIBA Korać Cup was the 20th edition of FIBA's Korać Cup basketball competition. The Italian Shampoo Clear Cantu defeated the Spanish Real Madrid Otaysa in the final. This was Shampoo Clear Cantu's fourth time winning the title.

First round

|}

Round of 32

|}

Round of 16

Quarterfinals

|}

Semifinals

|}

Finals

|}
After extra-time. Originally Real beat with 77–79

External links
 1990–91 FIBA Korać Cup @ linguasport.com
1990–91 FIBA Korać Cup

1990–91
1990–91 in European basketball